Pocket Maar may refer to:

 Pocket Maar (1956 film), a Hindi film
 Pocket Maar (1974 film), a Hindi film